Ilme Schlichting (born March 8, 1960) is a German biophysicist.

Academic work 

Ilme Schlichting studied biology and physics at the University of Heidelberg from 1979 to 1987. She earned a PhD in biology there in 1990. Schlichting pursued post-doctoral studies at the Max Planck Institute for Medical Research and at Brandeis University in Boston in the United States as a Feodor Lynen Fellow. From 1994 to 2001 she was head of a working group at the Max Planck Institute of Molecular Physiology in Dortmund. Since 2002 she is director of the department for Biomolecular Mechanisms at the Max Planck Institute for Medical Research.

Schlichting has studied the structure and operation of biomolecules using protein crystallography. During her PhD she made important contributions to the understanding of the switch function of the Michaelis complex and hence to the understanding of this enzyme during her doctorate using the Laue method.
Recently, Schlichting has been one of the founders of time-resolved  protein crystallography at Free-electron lasers.

Awards 

Feodor Lynen Fellowship, Alexander von Humboldt Foundation, 1990
Karl Lohmann Prize, 1991
Otto Hahn Medal, 1991
Ernst Schering Prize, 1998 
Gottfried Wilhelm Leibniz Prize, Deutsche Forschungsgemeinschaft, 2000
Member of the Academy of Sciences Leopoldina, 2003
Carus Medal, 2003
Fellow of the American Physical Society, 2003
Cross of Merit of Order of Merit of the Federal Republic of Germany, 2008
Spiers Memorial Award of the Royal Society of Chemistry, 2018

References

External links
Extended Curriculum Vitae
Department for Biomolecular Mechanisms at the Max Planck Institute for Medical Research 
Ilme Schlichting in the database of renowned scirentists AcademiaNet

1960 births
Living people
Scientists from Kiel
German biophysicists
21st-century German women scientists
Recipients of the Cross of the Order of Merit of the Federal Republic of Germany
Fellows of the American Physical Society
Max Planck Institute directors
Heidelberg University alumni
Members of the German Academy of Sciences Leopoldina
Women biophysicists